Francis X. Schilling (April 26, 1868March 29, 1949) was an American farmer and Republican politician from Marathon County, Wisconsin.  He represented Marathon County in the Wisconsin State Assembly during the 1913 session.  In historical documents his name was frequently abbreviated as

Biography

Born in the town of Cassel, Wisconsin, in Marathon County, Wisconsin, Schilling owned a farm in Cassel, Wisconsin, and was involved with the telephone and creamery businesses. He was chairman of the Cassel Town Board, town clerk and treasurer. He served on the Marathon County Board of Supervisors and was chairman. He served in the Wisconsin State Assembly in 1913 and 1914 and was a Republican. He died as a result of being hit by a car near his daughter's house.

References

1868 births
1949 deaths
People from Marathon County, Wisconsin
Businesspeople from Wisconsin
Farmers from Wisconsin
Road incident deaths in Wisconsin
Mayors of places in Wisconsin
County supervisors in Wisconsin
Members of the Wisconsin State Assembly
Pedestrian road incident deaths